Golf competitions at the 2019 Pan American Games in Lima, Peru were held between August 8 and 11, 2019 at the Country Club Villa.

A total of three events were contested: an individual competition for men and women plus a mixed team competition. A total of 64 golfers (32 per gender) qualified to compete at the 2020 Olympic Games.

Competition schedule
The following was the competition schedule for the golf competitions:

Medal table

Medalists

Qualification

A total of 64 golfers (32 per gender) qualified to compete. Each nation was able to enter a maximum of 4 athletes (two per gender). The host nation, Peru, automatically qualified the maximum number of athletes (4). The rest of the spots were awarded across the Official World Golf Ranking and Women's World Golf Rankings as of May 7, 2019. Any remaining spots were allocated using the World Amateur Golf Ranking as of May 9, 2019.

See also
Golf at the 2020 Summer Olympics

References

External links
Results book

 
Events at the 2019 Pan American Games
Pan American Games
2019